Swimmin' Time is the third studio album by American duo Shovels & Rope. It was released on August 26, 2014, under Dualtone Records.

A tour, in support of the album, was also announced.

Critical reception
Swimmin' Time was met with generally favorable reviews from critics. At Metacritic, which assigns a weighted average rating out of 100 to reviews from mainstream publications, this release received an average score of 74, based on 11 reviews.

Year-end list

Track listing

Charts

References

2014 albums
Dualtone Records albums